Arion is a Finnish metal band formed in 2011 and led by guitarist Iivo Kaipainen. Arion gained fame after performing their first song "Lost" in Uuden Musikiin Kilpailu 2013, the Finnish national final for the Eurovision Song Contest. They have since released several singles, an EP and three albums named Last of Us, Life Is Not Beautiful and Vultures Die Alone. In March 2016 Arion recorded a duet "At the Break of Dawn" together with Elize Ryd from Amaranthe.

Discography

Albums

Singles

References

Finnish power metal musical groups
Finnish symphonic metal musical groups